A Translator is a 2018 Cuban docudrama directed by Rodrigo Barriuso and Sebastián Barriuso. It was selected as the Cuban entry for the Best International Feature Film at the 92nd Academy Awards, but it was not nominated.

Plot
When survivors of the Chernobyl disaster arrive in Cuba for medical treatment, a local Russian literature professor is ordered to act as a translator.

Cast
 Rodrigo Santoro as Malin (the translator)
 Maricel Álvarez as Gladys (nurse)
 Yoandra Suárez as Isona (Malin's wife)
 Nikita Semenov as Alexi
 Jorge Carlos Perez Herrera as Javier
 Genadijs Dolganovs as Vladimir
 Milda Gecaite as Olga
 Eslinda Nuñez as Dr. Rivas
 Osvaldo Doimeadios as Dr. Sanchez
 Nataliya Rodina as Elena

See also
 List of submissions to the 92nd Academy Awards for Best International Feature Film
 List of Cuban submissions for the Academy Award for Best International Feature Film

References

External links
 

2018 films
2018 drama films
Cuban drama films
2010s Spanish-language films
2010s Russian-language films
Films about the Chernobyl disaster
Films about interpreting and translation